Ana Beloica (born 1992) is a politician in Serbia. She was elected to the National Assembly of Serbia in the 2020 Serbian parliamentary election as a member of the Serbian Progressive Party.

Private career
Beloica has a master's degree in economics and lives in Raška.

Politician
Beloica has been the vice-president of the Progressive Party's local board in Raška. and was a member of the party's Academy of Young Leaders program in 2019.

Parliamentarian
Beloica was one of several young party activists to be given a high placement on the Progressive Party's Aleksandar Vučić — For Our Children electoral list in the 2020 Serbian parliamentary election, receiving the tenth position. This was tantamount to election, and she was indeed elected when the list won a landslide majority with 188 mandates. She is now a member of the assembly committee on the economy, regional development, trade, tourism, and energy; a deputy member of the health and family committee and the committee on finance, state budget, and control of public spending; a member of Serbia's delegation to the Parliamentary Assembly of the Mediterranean; the leader of Serbia's parliamentary friendship group with The Gambia; and a member of the parliamentary friendship groups with China, Cuba, Egypt, France, Germany, Greece, Italy, Japan, Russia, Spain, Switzerland, the United Arab Emirates, the United Kingdom, the United States of America, and Venezuela.

References

1992 births
Living people
People from Raška, Serbia
21st-century Serbian women politicians
21st-century Serbian politicians
Members of the National Assembly (Serbia)
Members of the Parliamentary Assembly of the Mediterranean
Serbian Progressive Party politicians
Women members of the National Assembly (Serbia)